The Farman F.290 was a 5-seat transport aircraft built in France in the early 1930s.

Design
It was a high-wing strut-braced monoplane with fixed tailskid undercarriage. The fuselage and wings were of all-wood construction.

Variants
F.290
F.291
F.291/1

Specifications (F.290)

References

Bibliography

1930s French airliners
F.0290
High-wing aircraft
Aircraft first flown in 1931